Stéphane Houdet and Nicolas Peifer defeated the two-time defending champion Gordon Reid and his partner Alfie Hewett in the final, 6–4, 6–3 to win the men's doubles wheelchair tennis title at the 2017 French Open.

Shingo Kunieda and Reid were the two-time defending champions, but did not play together. Kunieda partnered Stefan Olsson, but was defeated by Houdet and Peifer in the semifinals.

Seeds

Draw

Finals

References
 Draw

Wheelchair Men's Doubles
French Open, 2017 Men's Doubles